Exordium may refer to:

 Exordium (book series), a science fiction book series written by Sherwood Smith and Dave Trowbridge
 Exordium (EP), by Dutch symphonic metal band After Forever.
 Exordium (rhetoric), the introductory section of a discourse in Western classical rhetoric
 Exordium clause, the first paragraph or sentence in a (last) will and testament
 "Exordium: The Beginning Of a Web", opening section of Delusion of the Fury by Harry Partch